The  is one denomination of the Japanese yen. 

The obverse of the coin depicts the Phoenix Hall of Byōdō-in, a Buddhist temple in Uji, Kyoto prefecture, with the kanji for "Japan" and "Ten Yen". The reverse shows the numerals "10" and the date of issue in kanji surrounded by bay laurel leaves.

History

Gold ten yen (1871-1910)
Ten yen coins were first issued in 1871 from a newly established mint at Osaka. The origin of mintage is not clear as there are conflicting reports stating that ten yen coins were either minted in San Francisco, or in Japan the prior year. In either case the unit of yen was officially adopted by the Meiji government in an act signed on June 27, 1871. Under the new law each ten yen coin was to weigh 257.2 grains, and contain 90% gold with a foreign exchange rate close to a United States Eagle ($10 USD coin). Gold bullion for coinage was delivered from private Japanese citizens, foreigners, and the Japanese government. No ten yen coins were minted between 1871 and 1876, during this time the Japanese government tried unsuccessfully to implement a gold standard with the amount of gold in circulation described as "very trifling". Gold bullion rose to a slight premium in 1874 which caused gold coin production as a whole to rapidly fall off. It was reported in the Quarterly Journal of Economics that by 1876 more gold coins were exported to foreign countries than for use domestically. Japan was later forced off of the gold standard in 1877 due to the cost of the Satsuma Rebellion. Twenty years would pass before the Japanese government went back on the gold standard. During this lapse non circulating ten yen gold coins were made in two non-consecutive years for two different reasons. The first occasion occurred in 1880 when ten yen gold proof coins were struck for exclusive use in presentation sets that were given away as gifts to foreign diplomats. The second and final instance involved the World's Columbian Exposition in 1892 where several newly minted coins were put on display. 

When Japan went back on the gold standard in 1897, new ten yen coins were set by law to weigh 8.3g and have a diameter of 21.2mm. These new lighter and smaller coins were given a new design which features a sunburst superimposed on the sacred mirror on the obverse, and the value within a wreath on the reverse. The adoption of the gold standard allowed Japanese ten yen gold certificates to be redeemed for gold. This convertible paper currency was used in immense numbers while coined yen was seldom used or seen. Gold ten yen coins of the second design (1897 to 1910) mostly remained in government vaults by the time mintage ceased for good in 1910. The coins that had been minted during those thirteen years continued to back up gold certificates until World War I due to inflation. The remaining gold coins in circulation were eventually withdrawn due to wartime conditions in the late 1930s.  Those that remained in circulation were either hoarded or melted down by the public.

Modern ten yen (1950-)
The first ten yen coins made after World War II were authorized by law on March 2, 1950 by prime minister Shigeru Yoshida. These coins were to be made of German Silver, and act as "temporary subsidiary coins". A total of 432,970,000 ten yen coins minted in this new alloy were recorded as struck by the end of that year. By the end of 1951 almost 800 million of these coins had been minted and were waiting to be distributed. None of the German silver coins minted between 1950 and 1951 ever circulated as the coins were eventually melted. The decision to melt the coins came as the Korean War had driven nickel prices to about 4.1 million yen per ton. Those that escaped being melted and are now considered by collectors to be "scarce" Japanese pattern coins. Bronze ten yen coins were first minted in 1951, but were not released for general circulation until January 4 , 1953. Ten yen coins minted between 1950 and 1958 have reeded edges and are nicknamed , meaning “jagged 10 yen coin” in Japanese. The design which is used today features Phoenix Hall of Byōdō-in on the obverse, and Bay laurel leaves on the reverse. The design remains essentially the same other than the reeds being dropped in 1959 which gave the coins a smooth edge. Slight modifications were also made in the latter half of 1986 regarding the design of Byōdō-in. These coins are not culturally  recommended as shrine offerings as another word for "10" is "toh" (十), and another word for "yen" is "en" (円). Ten yen coins continue to be produced up to the present under the Reiwa era.

Composition

Circulation figures

Meiji
The following are circulation figures for the coins that were minted between the 4th, and the 43rd year of Meiji's reign. Coins for this period all begin with the Japanese symbol 明治 (Meiji).

Inscriptions on Japanese coins from this period are read clockwise from right to left: 
"Year" ← "Number representing year of reign" ← "Emperor's name" (Ex: 年 ← 五十三 ← 治明)

Shōwa

The following are circulation dates which cover Emperor Hirohito's reign. The dates below correspond with the 26th to the 64th year (last) of his reign. All ten yen coins that were made before 1959 have reeded edges, this has since changed to the present day smooth edge. Coins for this period will all begin with the Japanese symbol 昭和 (Shōwa).

Japanese coins are read with a left to right format: 
"Emperors name" → "Number representing year of reign" → "Year" (Ex: 昭和 → 三十四 → 年).

Heisei

The following are circulation dates during the reign of Emperor Akihito. who was crowned in 1989. The dates below correspond with the 1st to the 31st year (last) of his reign. First year of reign coins are marked with a 元 symbol (first) as a one year type. Coins for this period all begin with the Japanese symbol 平成 (Heisei).

Japanese coins are read with a left to right format: 
"Emperors name" → "Number representing year of reign" → "Year" (Ex: 平成 → 十 → 年).

Reiwa
The following are circulation dates in the reign of the current Emperor. Naruhito's accession to the Crysanthemum Throne took place on May 1, 2019 and he was formally enthroned on October 22, 2019. Coins for this period all begin with the Japanese symbol 令和 (Reiwa). The inaugural year coin (2019) was marked 元 (first) and debuted during the summer of that year.

Japanese coins are read with a left to right format: 
"Emperors name" → "Number representing year of reign" → "Year" (Ex: 令和 → 二 → 年).

Collecting
The value of any given coin is determined by survivability rate and condition as collectors in general prefer uncleaned appealing coins. The first ten yen coins were made from 1871 to 1892 with coins dated 1871, 1876, 1877, 1880, and 1892 using a dragon design. All of these dates outside of those from 1871 (year 4) are now rarely found for sale as they are highly valued. Coins with the latter of these two dates were never intended for circulation as coins dated 1880 (year 13) were part of presentation sets. It's now estimated that only four to five known "year 13" coins have survived with an example selling at auction for $276,000 (USD) in 2011. No surviving examples are known for coins dated 1892 (year 25) which had been exhibited at the World's Columbian Exposition. 

The second smaller design used for this denomination was minted from 1897 to 1910 after Japan officially adopted the gold standard. These are generally valued in lesser amounts than their predecessors, though rarer key dates in this group include coins dated 1904, 1907, and 1910. As a whole, the series dated from 1870 to 1910 can also be found on the market inside "Ministry of Finance" labeled plastic holders. These came from a hoard of 30,000 gold coins that were found to have been held by the Ministry of Finance. The Japanese government held a series of auctions from 2005 through 2007 which included previously unreported rare coins in denominations of 5, 10 and 20 Yen. 

Modern ten yen coins date back to 1951 (year 26 of Shōwa) when the coins were struck for circulation using a bronze alloy. There is a misconception among the Japanese public that  (yen made between 1951 to 1958) are worth a lot of money because of their reeds. On average these coins are worth only 3 to 4 times their face value, or in some cases just their face value. Ten yen coins from this period are only valued highly in uncirculated grades. Modifications to the ten yen coin were made in 1986 which show slight differences in the appearance of Byodoin Phoenix Hall. Those made in the latter half of 1986 with these temple changes were reported to be worth over $1,000 (USD) by TV Tokyo in 2019.

Notes

References 

Japanese yen coins
Ten-base-unit coins